The Special Presidential Division (DSP, after the original French Division Spéciale Présidentielle) was an elite military force created by Zairian President Mobutu Sese Seko in 1985 and charged with his personal security. Trained by Israeli advisors, the DSP was among the few units paid adequately and regularly. It was commanded by Mobutu's cousin, General Etienne Nzimbi Ngbale Kongo wa Basa. The soldiers were recruited only from Mobutu's own tribe. The force was used to deal with internal opponents or suspected opponents. People were taken away, tortured, imprisoned without trial, exiled to another part of the country, or simply disappeared.

After the Rwandan Patriotic Army invaded northern Rwanda at the start of the civil war, Mobutu sent several hundred DSP troops to assist the government of Juvénal Habyarimana. In 1993, the DSP was sent to quell unrest in Masisi, North Kivu but inflamed the situation after it sided with the Hutu residents against the indigenous Bahunde. It also shipped cobalt from Shaba Province to Zambia. (Reno 1997, 48) A 1996 United Nations report noted that Prime Minister Étienne Tshisekedi and his staff were subject to routine surveillance and harassment by DSP soldiers.

Notes and references

Further reading 
Gérard Prunier, From Genocide to Continental War: The "Congolese" Conflict and the Crisis of Contemporary Africa, C. Hurst & Co, 2009, 

Military of Zaire
Protective security units
Military units and formations established in 1985
Military units and formations disestablished in 1997